Judolia montivagans is a species of beetle in the family Cerambycidae. It was described by Couper in 1864.

References

M
Beetles described in 1864